Brading railway station is a Grade II listed railway station serving Brading on the Isle of Wight, England. It is located on the Island Line from Ryde to Shanklin. Owing to its secluded countryside location, as well as its single operational platform from 1988 to 2021, it is one of the quietest stations on the island.

History 
The station was opened in 1864 by the Isle of Wight Railway on their initial Ryde-Shanklin line. In 1882 it became a junction station, when the Brading-Bembridge branch line opened as part of the Brading Haven reclamation scheme. The branch line closed to passengers in 1953 and completely in 1957.

Under Southern Railway ownership, the passing loop was extended southwards from Brading to Sandown in 1927, forming a second section of double track on the Island Line.

Brading was one of the last stations on the British Rail network to retain gas lighting, with the fittings converted to mercury vapour usage in 1985. As of 2010 some of the fittings were still in use, now using compact fluorescent bulbs.

Brading signalbox closed on 28 October 1988, and the passing loop at Brading station was removed, meaning that only one platform remained in use.  This meant trains could no longer run at even 30-minute intervals on the line. By 1998 the signal box and branch platforms were very overgrown and the buildings were threatened with demolition. In August 2007 Brading Town Council announced a plan to revamp the exterior of the station buildings and former signal box, and have used grants and volunteers to gradually reopen different parts of the station, with the whole of the station and signal box fully opening to the public in March 2010 for the first time in 40 years. Both the signal box and main station building are Grade II listed, along with the station building on the east platform, the footbridge, and the station house.

The current footbridge was installed in the late 1990s, as part of Railtracks Station Regeneration Programme - the original bridge was no longer safe. The replacement is an identical copy of the original, which was taken to the McAlpine collection in Oxfordshire.

Reinstatement of passing loop
An announcement on 16 September 2019 confirmed that a passing loop would be reinstated at Brading to allow trains to run at regular half-hourly intervals. £1 million to fund building the passing loop was to be from local sources with £300,000 from the Isle of Wight Council and the remainder from local businesses through the Solent Local Enterprise Partnership. A second platform would be opened to passenger use, according to the brief given to potential contractors for the work on the upgrade and the level crossing to the south of the station would be upgraded to give step-free access to the southbound platform.  This work was completed in 2021.

Stationmasters

John Ballard ca. 1866 - 1867 
George Humby ca. 1868 - 1871 (afterwards station master at Shanklin)
William Wetherick from 1871  (afterwards station master at Ventnor)
George William Corbett ca. 1874 - 1911
William Whemay 1911 - 1924
H.J. Attrill ca. 1931 - 1941 (afterwards station master at Sandown)

Facilities 

The restored signal box and station buildings are now home to a heritage centre, café, museum and a Tourist Information Point, along with a bike hire shop.

No railway staff are present at the station, with tickets available from an automatic machine or from the guard on board the train.

Services 
As of May 2022, there are two trains in each direction per hour during the peak and one during the off-peak. Services call at all stations except Smallbrook Junction, which operates only during steam operating dates and times, and only one service an hour calls at Ryde Pier Head.

Since the reinstatement of the passing loop, trains to Ryde leave from platform 1 and trains to Shanklin leave from platform 2.

References

External links 

Railway stations on the Isle of Wight
DfT Category F2 stations
Former Isle of Wight Railway stations
Railway stations in Great Britain opened in 1864
Island Line railway stations (Isle of Wight)
Grade II listed buildings on the Isle of Wight
Brading